The 2016 Tiburon Challenger was a professional tennis tournament played on outdoor hard courts. It was the tenth edition of the tournament which was part of the 2016 ATP Challenger Tour. It took place in Tiburon, United States between 26 September and 2 October 2016.

Singles main draw entrants

Seeds

 1 Rankings are as of September 19, 2016.

Other entrants
The following players received wildcards into the singles main draw:
  Brian Baker
  Robbie C. Bellamy
  Mackenzie McDonald
  Noah Rubin

The following players received entry into the singles main draw as special exempts:
  Tennys Sandgren
  John-Patrick Smith

The following players received entry from the qualifying draw:
  Michael Mmoh
  Brydan Klein 
  Lloyd Glasspool 
  Salvatore Caruso

Champions

Singles

 Darian King def.   Michael Mmoh, 7–6(7–2), 6–2.

Doubles

 Matt Reid /  John-Patrick Smith def.  Quentin Halys /  Dennis Novikov, 6–1, 6–2.

External links

Tiburon Challenger
2016 in American tennis
2016 in sports in California